Sticta isidiokunthii is a species of foliose lichen in the family Peltigeraceae. Found in the South American Andes, it was formally described by Bibiana Moncada and Robert Lücking in 2012. It grows on the bark of shrubs and small trees, often associated with liverworts in the genera Metzgeria and Microlejeunea, as well as lichens from the genera Erioderma, Leptogium, and Sticta. The specific epithet refers to its resemblance to Sticta kunthii and the fact that it makes isidia.

References

isidiokunthii
Lichen species
Lichens described in 2012
Lichens of Colombia
Taxa named by Robert Lücking